Joe Herbert (born 8 April 1936) is Emeritus Professor of Neuroscience at the University of Cambridge.

Education
Herbert received a BSc (Hons. Class I) in Anatomical Studies from the University of Birmingham in 1957 followed by a Doctor of Medicine from the University of Birmingham in 1960 and a PhD in neuroendocrinology from the University of London in 1965.

Career
Prior to joining the Department of Anatomy at the University of Cambridge as a lecturer in 1971, Herbert was a lecturer in the Department of Anatomy at the University of Birmingham. There he worked under Solly Zuckerman, Baron Zuckerman, who had supervised his PhD. Herbert has been a fellow at Gonville and Caius College, Cambridge since 1976.
He was the Director of Training at the University of Cambridge Centre for Brain Repair (1992-2014) and a past president (1982) of the International Academy of Sex Research. In the course of his career, Herbert has served as the PhD supervisor or Post-doctoral mentor of several distinguished British neuroscientists, including Barry Everitt, Alan Dixson, Angela Roberts, Barry Keverne, Michael Hastings, and David Abbott.

Research
Herbert's work has primarily focused on hormones; The Guardian has called him 'one of the world's leading endocrinologists.' His areas of expertise include the role of hormones in the ability of the adult brain to make new nerve cells (neurons) and repair the brain; how hormones regulate behavior; the neuroscience of stress; how hormones, genes and the social and psychological environment interact to promote the risk for depression; and studies on the way that hormones and genes influence financial decision-making. He has published more than 250 peer-reviewed papers on these topics.

Writing
Herbert has authored two books, The Minder Brain (World Scientific Publishing Co., 2007), and Testosterone: Sex, Power and the Will to Win (Oxford University Press, 2015).

Allegations of sexism, bullying and harassment

In August 2022, reports revealed that Herbert was found to have bullied and harassed a junior female colleague during a dispute over a controversial slavery report.

References

External links
Cambridge Neuroscience biography of Joseph Herbert

1936 births
Living people
English neuroscientists
English science writers
English male non-fiction writers
Fellows of Gonville and Caius College, Cambridge